Megan Rooney (born 1985) is a Canadian-born, London-based artist who creates paintings, sculptures, installations, performances and poetry. Rooney is known for integrating contrasting disciplines, such as painting, sculpture performance, into a single work. She received her MFA from Goldsmiths, University of London in 2011 and, prior to that, completed her BA at the University of Toronto in Canada. Her work has been shown in solo museum exhibitions at the Salzburger Kunstverein, Salzburg (2020–21); Museum of Contemporary Art, Toronto (2020); and Kunsthalle Düsseldorf (2019). Her performances include SUN DOWN MOON UP, as part of the Park Nights programme at Serpentine Galleries, London in 2018; and EVERYWHERE BEEN THERE, created in collaboration with choreographer Temitope Ajose-Cutting and musician Paolo Thorsen-Nagel, at the Kunsthalle Düsseldorf in 2019 and the Museum of Contemporary Art, Toronto in 2020.

Solo Exhibitions
2021: BONES ROOTS FRUITS, Thaddaeus Ropac, London, UK
2020: Green, I Want You Green, Salzburger Kunstverein, Salzburg, Austria
2020: HUSH SKY MURMUR HOLE, Museum of Contemporary Art, Toronto, Canada
2019: TEETH & LIGHTNING, SALTS, Basel, Switzerland
2019: Fire On The Mountain, Kunsthalle Düsseldorf, Germany
2018: Cuckoo till I come back, Drei, Cologne, Germany
2017: MOMMA! MOMMA!, Tramway, Glasgow, UK
2017: Hullabaloo, Cordova, Vienna, Austria
2017: Sun Up Moon Down, Freymond-Guth Fine Arts, Basel, Switzerland
2016: Animals on the bed, Seventeen, London, UK
2016: Piggy Piggy, Croy Nielsen, Berlin, Germany
2015: Okie Dog on Santa Monica, Almanac Inn, Turin, Italy
2014: Tilia Americana, Opening Times – Digital Art Commissions

Group Exhibitions 

 2022: La couleur en fugue / Fugues in Color, Fondation Louis Vuitton, Paris, France
 2021: Sweet Lies. Rethinking Identity, Ludwig Forum für Internationale Kunst, Aachen, Germany
 2019: Where water comes together with other water, 15th Biennale de Lyon Art Contemporain, Lyon, France
 2019: Paint, also known as Blood. Women, Affect, and Desire in Contemporary Painting, Museum of Modern Art, Warsaw, Poland
 2018: CHILDHOOD: Another banana day for the dream-fish, Palais de Tokyo, Paris, France
 2017: (X) A Fantasy, David Roberts Art Foundation, London, UK
 2017: Ministry of Internal Affairs. Intimacy as Text, Museum of Modern Art, Warsaw, Poland
 2014: Till the stars turn cold, S1 Artspace, Sheffield; Glasgow Sculpture Studio, Glasgow, UK
 2014: Der Leone Have Sept Cabeças, CRAC Alsace, Altkirch, France
 2014: read the room / you've got to, SALTS, Basel, Switzerland
 2014: Pleasure Principles, Fondation d'entreprise Galeries Lafayette, Paris, France
 2013: Ocean Living (with Holly White), Arcadia Missa, London, UK

References

21st-century Canadian artists
21st-century Canadian women artists
Living people
Alumni of Goldsmiths, University of London
Canadian women poets
21st-century Canadian poets
21st-century Canadian women writers
Contemporary artists
Canadian contemporary artists
1985 births